Mareš (feminine Marešová) is a Czech surname. Notable people with the surname include:

 Anna Marešová, Czech rower
 František Mareš, Czechoslovak professor of physiology and philosophy, and nationalist politician
 Jakub Mareš, Czech football player
 Jaroslav Mareš, Czech biologist, traveller and writer
 Jaroslav Mareš (actor), Czech film actor, see cz:Jaroslav Mareš
 Kateřina Marešová, Czech gymnast
 Leoš Mareš, Czech television personality and singer
 Martin Mareš, Czech cyclist
 Michal Mareš, Czech futsal player
 Oldřiška Marešová, Czech athlete
 Pavel Mareš, Czech football player
 Petr Mareš, Czech football player
 Roman Mareš, Czech futsal player

See also
 Maresch, a Germanized version of the surname

Czech-language surnames